The Roman Catholic Diocese of Bayuna was a short-lived (1504–1511) Antillian Catholic bishopric with see at Lares de Guahaba.

History 
It was established on 1504.11.15 as Diocese of Bayuna, one of the first bishoprics in the New World, on Spanish-colonial territory formally split off canonically from the Archdiocese of Sevilla (Andalusia, Spain), like the Archdiocese of Hyaguata which became its Metropolitan, both in the present Dominican Republic, on Hispaniola (Greater Antilles).

It was suppressed on 8 August 1511, having had a single incumbent, who was transferred to the newly erected (then) Diocese of Santo Domingo (later Metropolitan).

Episcopal Ordinary 
Suffragan Bishop of Bayuna 
 Bishop-elect Francisco Garcia de Padilla, (Spaniard?) Friars Minor (O.F.M.) (1504.11.15 – 1511.08.13), next first Bishop of Santo Domingo (Dominican Republic) (1511.08.13 – death 1515).

See also 
 List of Catholic dioceses in the Dominican Republic

Sources and external links 

 GCatholic - data for all sections

Former Roman Catholic dioceses in America